Gongzhuling South railway station is a railway station on the Harbin–Dalian section of the Beijing–Harbin High-Speed Railway. It is in Gongzhuling, Jilin province, China.

See also
Chinese Eastern Railway
South Manchuria Railway
South Manchuria Railway Zone

References

Railway stations in Changchun
Gongzhuling